Nothing to Wish For (Nothing to Lose) is the fourth album by the English shoegazing band Air Formation. It was released on the label Club AC30 on March 1, 2010.

Track listing
 "Three Years Pass" – 5:53
 "Stars and Knives" – 4:01
 "Low December Sun" – 3:09
 "Alone at Last" – 5:54
 "Don't Wait 'Til Dawn" – 5:23
 "Meltdown" – 3:14
 "Until Today" – 5:10
 "Like I Hold You" – 4:36
 "Cut Through the Night" – 4:40
 "Outro" – 4:38
 "Distant Silhouettes" - 5:35

Personnel
Matt Bartram – guitar, six string bass, vocals
Ben Pierce – bass
Richard Parks – keyboards
James Harrison – drums
Ian Sheridan – guitar, feedback

2010 albums
Air Formation albums